Taylor Dent won in the final 6–3, 7–6(7–5) against Juan Carlos Ferrero.

Seeds

  Juan Carlos Ferrero (final)
  Andy Roddick (withdrew because of a hamstring injury)
  Carlos Moyá (quarterfinals)
  Paradorn Srichaphan (quarterfinals)
  Jarkko Nieminen (semifinals)
  Ivan Ljubičić (semifinals)
  Fabrice Santoro (first round)
  Taylor Dent (champion)

Draw

Finals

Top half

Bottom half

References
 2003 Thailand Open Draw

Singles
Thailand Open - Singles
 in Thai tennis